Newsham may refer to:

Places
Newsham, County Durham, a settlement in County Durham 
Aislaby, County Durham and Newsham, a civil parish in County Durham
Newsham, Lancashire
Newsham, Northumberland, a location in Northumberland,  England
 Newsham railway station, Northumberland
Newsham, Hambleton, a location in North Yorkshire, England
 Newsham with Breckenbrough, a civil parish in North Yorkshire
Newsham, Richmondshire, North Yorkshire
Newsham gas field, North Sea off Yorkshire

People
Brad Newsham (born 1951), American travel writer
Joseph P. Newsham (1837–1919), American politician, lawyer, merchant and planter
Marc Newsham (born 1987), English footballer
Peter Newsham, chief of the Metropolitan Police Department of the District of Columbia 
Richard Newsham (died 1743), English inventor
Tim Newsham, computer security professional

See also
 Little Newsham, a village in County Durham, England
 Neasham, a village in County Durham, England
 Newham (disambiguation)